Junard "Ahong" Quirante Chan (born September 8, 1968) is a Filipino politician from Lapu-Lapu City, Philippines. He currently serves as the mayor of Lapu-Lapu City. Chan previously served as barangay captain of Pajo, Lapu-Lapu City from 2013 to 2019 and as a member of the City Council from 2001 to 2010.

Amidst the COVID-19 pandemic, Chan tested positive for COVID-19 on June 11 although he is asymptomatic at the time of confirmation.

References

External links
 

1968 births
Living people
PDP–Laban politicians